Enrique Federico Dondo Umpierre (born 18 October 1971) is a former professional tennis player from Uruguay.

Biography
Dondo, who comes from the city of Salto, appeared in 23 Davis Cup ties for Uruguay, the first in 1994.

A right-handed player, he made his only ATP Tour main draw in singles at the 1996 Colombia Open in Bogota, beating sixth seeded countryman Marcelo Filippini, before losing in the second round to Alejandro Hernández. In doubles he was a two-time ATP Tour quarter-finalist, partnering Marcelo Filippini.

He featured in the qualifying draws at both the French Open and Wimbledon in 1997.

At the 1999 Pan American Games he lost to Cecil Mamiit in the quarter-finals.

Retiring in 2004, he began coaching that year at San Isidro Lomas in Las Piedras.

References

External links
 
 
 

1971 births
Living people
Uruguayan male tennis players
Tennis players at the 1999 Pan American Games
Pan American Games competitors for Uruguay
Sportspeople from Salto, Uruguay